Martin O'Donnell (born 4 June 1986) is an English former professional snooker player. He gained a two-year place on the main snooker tour by coming through Q School in 2012. He practices at Shootpool & Snooker in Aylesbury.

Career

Early career 
As an amateur, O'Donnell played in all 12 of the Players Tour Championship events during the 2010/2011 season. He reached the second round on three occasions, but could not progress any further, however, in Event 3 he defeated former world champion, Shaun Murphy 4–3. O'Donnell finished 109th on the Order of Merit.
He entered Q School at the end of the season in an attempt to turn professional and in the final event he was one match away from achieving this. He played Kurt Maflin and lost 1–4.

In the 2011/2012 season, O'Donnell was again confined to entering the PTC events, playing 9 of the 12. He reached the main draw on six occasions but failed to win a match once there. He won the SnookerBacker Classic, which guaranteed him entry into Q School at the end of the season. O'Donnell won five matches at the first Q School event, concluding with a 4–1 victory over Adrian Ridley, to secure a two-year tour card beginning with the 2012/2013 season.

Professional debut 
O'Donnell's first match as a professional was in qualifying for the Wuxi Classic. He beat David Grace 5–2, before losing to Alfie Burden 3–5. He went one better in qualifying for the next ranking event, the Australian Goldfields Open, by defeating Jeff Cundy and Grace once more, but was then whitewashed 0–5 by David Gilbert. He did not win two consecutive matches in qualifying for any other event this season.

O'Donnell played in all ten minor-ranking Players Tour Championship events and did not win a match in any of them, until his final attempt at the European Tour Event 5 in Scotland. He saw off Sean O'Sullivan, Craig Steadman, Kurt Maflin all by 4–3 scorelines to reach the quarter-finals, but his run was ended as Andrew Higginson advanced with a 4–2 win. This helped O'Donnell to finish 83rd on the PTC Order of Merit. His season ended when he was beaten 5–10 by Tian Pengfei in the first round of World Championship Qualifying. O'Donnell finished his first year on the tour ranked world number 86.

2013/2014 season
O'Donnell was beaten in the qualifying rounds for eight ranking events in the 2013/2014 season. All 128 players on the tour entered the UK Championship and Welsh Open at the first round stage, with O'Donnell losing at this stage in both. The only event he qualified for this season was the China Open by defeating David Gilbert 5–1. He received a bye through the first round due to Stuart Bingham's withdrawal which meant he would play in the last 32 of a ranking event for the first time. O'Donnell faced Craig Steadman and was edged out 5–4. In the European Tour events his best result came at the Rotterdam Open where he beat experienced players Robert Milkins and Marcus Campbell, before losing 4–0 to Stuart Bingham in the last 16. As he ended his second season at world number 92, outside the top 64 in the rankings, his other route to remain on tour next year was through the European Order of Merit, with eight places available to non-qualified players. O'Donnell finished 59th, less than 300 points short of Tony Drago who received the final spot and entered Q School to retain his professional status. He was eliminated in the last 64 in both events and had amateur status for the coming season.

2014/2015 season
O'Donnell qualified for the first round of three of the six European Tour events during the 2014/2015 season. His only win came at the first event, the Riga Open where he defeated Alfie Burden 4–2, but then lost 4–1 to Mark Williams in the second round. At the end of the season he won his place back on the tour by coming through three matches at the EBSA Play-Offs, culminating with a 4–3 victory over Jamie Clarke.

2015/2016 season
O'Donnell overcame Gerard Greene 6–4 to qualify for the International Championship and lost 6–2 to Neil Robertson in the first round. In the first round of the Welsh Open he knocked out Stephen Maguire, making a 130 break along the way, but was then defeated 4–2 by Matthew Stevens. O'Donnell beat another multiple ranking event winner when he recovered from 3–1 down to Mark Williams to triumph 5–3 and qualify for the China Open. He then ousted Joe Swail 5–2 and Matthew Selt 5–1 to reach the last 16 of a ranking event for the first time, but he was thrashed 5–0 by Mark King.

2016/2017 season
O'Donnell qualified for the Riga Masters and beat Sam Craigie 4–3, before losing 4–3 to Jimmy Robertson. He had to wait until the penultimate event of the year to reach the last 32 again as he qualified for the China Open by edging past Thepchaiya Un-Nooh 5–4 and thrashed Jimmy Robertson 5–0. O'Donnell would be defeated 5–1 by Mark Selby and is playing in Q School as he was ranked 74th in the world, outside the top 64 who keep their places. He lost 4–1 to Lukas Kleckers in the last round of the first event and 4–3 to Ashley Carty in the third round of the second, but took the final place through the Q School Order of Merit to earn a new two-year tour card.

Performance and rankings timeline

Career finals

Pro-am finals: 1 (1 title)

Amateur finals: 6 (3 titles)

References

External links 

Martin O’Donnell at worldsnooker.com

1986 births
English snooker players
English people of Irish descent
Living people
People from Dunstable